South Korea competed at the 2022 World Athletics Championships in Eugene, Oregon from 15 to 24 July 2022. South Korea had entered 3 athletes.

Medalists

Results

Men
Track and road events

Field events

References

South Korea
World Championships in Athletics
2022